Cineraria longipes is a species of flowering plant in the family Asteraceae. It is found only in South Africa. Its natural habitat is subtropical or tropical dry shrubland. It is threatened by habitat loss.

References

longipes
Flora of South Africa
Endangered plants
Taxonomy articles created by Polbot